Ribes triste, known as the northern redcurrant, swamp redcurrant, or wild redcurrant, is an Asian and North American shrub in the gooseberry family. It is widespread across Canada and the northern United States, as well as in eastern Asia (Russia, China, Korea, Japan).

Ribes triste grows in wet rocky woods, swamps, and cliffs. The leaves are alternate, palmately lobed with five lobes,  in diameter. The axis of the raceme is glandular. Each raceme bears 6-13 small, purplish flowers that appear in June and July. The fruit is a bright red berry, without the hairs that some currants have. The fruit is edible but rather sour.

Conservation status in the United States
It is listed as endangered in Connecticut and Ohio, and as threatened in Pennsylvania.

As a weed
Ribes is listed a plant pest in Michigan and the planting of it in certain parts of the state is prohibited.

Use by Native Americans

In cuisine
Alaska Natives use the fruit as food, eating it raw, and making the berries into jam and jellies. Eskimos eat the berries and the Inupiat eat them raw or cooked, mix them with other berries which are used to make a traditional dessert. They also mix the berries with rosehips and highbush cranberries and boil them into a syrup. The Iroquois mash the fruit, make them into small cakes, and store them for future use. They later soak the fruit cakes in warm water and cooked them a sauce or mixed them with corn bread. They also sun dry or fire dry the raw or cooked fruit for future use and take the dried fruit with them as a hunting food. The Ojibwe eat the berries raw, and also preserve them by cooking them, spreading them on birch bark into little cakes, which are dried and stored for winter use. In the winter, they often eat the berries with cooked with sweet corn. They also use the berries to make jams and preserves. The Upper Tanana eat the berries as food.

In medicine
The Ojibwe take a decoction of the root and stalk for 'gravel',
and take a compound  decoction of the stalk for 'stoppage of periods', and use the leaves as a 'female remedy'. The Upper Tanana use a decoction of the stems, without the bark, as a wash for sore eyes.

References

Bibliography
 
 
 

triste
Flora of North America
Flora of Eastern Asia
Flora of China
Flora of the Russian Far East
Flora of Siberia
Plants used in traditional Native American medicine
Bird food plants
Plants described in 1797
Berries
Plants used in Native American cuisine